The ITV News at 10.30 was a flagship news programme on British television network ITV, broadcast on Monday to Friday at 10:30pm, between 2 February 2004 and 10 January 2008. It was produced by ITN. It was introduced into the ITV schedule as the ITV News at Ten-Thirty on 2 February 2004, following the demise of the ITV Nightly News.

There was a twenty-five-minute broadcast of British national and international news, with a dedicated business, sports, and a review of the following morning' newspaper front pages. It was followed by a five-minute round-up of news from the ITV regions around the United Kingdom.

The programme was broadcast for the final time in the 10:30pm timeslot on Thursday 10 January 2008, with News at Ten relaunching the following Monday.

On Monday 27 February, 2017, News at Ten moved to 10:30pm (as "ITV News") for eight consecutive weeks to make way for new entertainment programme The Nightly Show. The Nightly Show finished on 21 April 2017 and ITV News at Ten returned to its usual time of 10:00pm from 24 April 2017.

Overview

Unlike its predecessors (ITV Nightly News, the first two incarnations of ITV News at Ten and ITV Weekend News), the programme ran at its regular time of 10:30pm every weeknight.
Its main rival was the BBC Ten O'Clock News on BBC One, which consistently beat it in the ratings and was broadcast half an hour before it. Its other main rival was the BBC's other flagship evening news programme, Newsnight, on BBC Two.

On Wednesday 31 October 2007, it was confirmed that ITV was planning to bring back News at Ten, with the presenter Trevor McDonald and former Sky News presenter Julie Etchingham.

Presenters

References

2004 British television series debuts
2008 British television series endings
News at 10.30
News at 10.30